Adélaïde Labille-Guiard (née Labille; 11 April 1749 – 24 April 1803), also known as Adélaïde Labille-Guiard des Vertus, was a French miniaturist and portrait painter. She was an advocate for women to receive the same opportunities as men to become great painters. Labille-Guiard was one of the first women to become a member of the Royal Academy, and was the first female artist to receive permission to set up a studio for her students at the Louvre.

Studies 

Labille-Guiard became a master at miniatures, pastels, and oil paintings. Little is known about her training due to the practices of the 18th century which dictated masters (who were predominately male) should not take on female pupils. During this time, women were perceived as incapable to follow instruction alongside men. During her adolescence, Labille-Guiard studied miniature painting with oil painter François-Élie Vincent and her early work was exhibited at the Académie de Saint-Luc. She apprenticed with the pastel master Quentin de la Tour until 1774.

Accomplishments

Exhibitions at the Académie de Saint-Luc
Labille-Guiard was admitted to the Académie de Saint-Luc in 1767 when she was twenty years old. Her admission piece has since disappeared and sadly no records of its existence survive today. The Académie de Saint-Luc provided Labille-Guiard with a space to practice art professionally. In 1774, she exhibited her work at its Salon. This show was so successful that the Royal Academy took offence, and with the backing of the monarchy, issued an edict in March 1776 abolishing “guilds, brotherhoods, and communities of arts and crafts”, forcing the Académie de Saint-Luc to close its doors in 1777. However, this did not stop Labille-Guiard's ambitions as an artist.

Becoming a member of the Royal Academy
Once the Académie de Saint-Luc closed its doors, Labille-Guiard began to learn oil painting, so she could apply to the Royal Academy which required her to present at least one oil painting for admission. Labille-Guiard chose to display some of her work at the Salon de la Correspondance in 1779. This included her self-portrait in pastel and oil portraits, which were well received by critics. Labille-Guiard's talent as an oil painter and pastellist was quickly noticed, and she received national recognition, ultimately leading to her acceptance into the Royal Academy. 
On May 31, 1783, Labille-Guiard was accepted as a member of the French Academie Royale de Peinture et de Sculpture. Her rival, Elisabeth-Louise Vigée Le Brun, was also elected on that day. Becoming accepted into the Royal Academy opened doors for Labille-Guiard as she gained patronage from the royal family.

Painter for the Royal Family
Through pure artistic ability and talent, Labille-Guiard became a painter for the Royal family. Her royal patrons included the aunt of Louis XVI of France, Princess Marie Adélaïde and her sister Victoria Louise, and the King's sister Elizabeth and earned her a government pension of 1,000 livres. The portrait of Adélaïde completed in 1787 was one of Labille-Guiard's largest and most ambitious work to that date. She was later commissioned in 1788 by the King's brother, the Count of Provence (later Louis XVIII of France). She was instructed to paint him at the centre of a large historical work, Réception d'un chevalier de Saint-Lazare par Monsieur, Grand maître de l'ordre.
In 1795 she obtained artist's lodging at the Louvre and a new pension of 2,000 livres. She was the first woman artist to be permitted to set up a studio for herself and her students at the Louvre.

Style and context 
Labille-Guiard often did not fit comfortably within the boundaries of feminine virtue in the 18th century. In order to appeal to a wide variety of viewers including upper-class men and women, she often incorporated recent fashions into her paintings, which allowed her to showcase her artistic ability. She was good at rendering details, such as showing luxurious folds and layers of complex skirts that were in fashion at the time. However, often she painted with a twist such as having women face directly at the viewer or with a low neckline, which was an uncommon practice in the 18th century when portraying women.

Further evidence of Labille-Guiard's boldness can be seen in her self-portraits, which leave her exposed slightly more than usual, but not enough to evoke allegations of promiscuous behaviour. This is seen in her painting Self-Portrait with Two Pupils. Unlike some other paintings of female artists in the 18th century, Labille-Guiard chose to depict herself actively working rather than passive and at rest. Labille-Guiard also pushed against other restrictions, such as those that limited the number of females that could attend the Royal Academy. By depicting two female students in Self-Portrait with Two Pupils, Labille-Guiard suggests more women should be allowed in to the Royal Academy. In this sense, Labille-Guiard was daring, but not too daring as to sabotage her reputation and lose the respect she worked hard to gain within the art world.

Advocate for young female artists  
Labille-Guiard had an impact on her young female artists. In a letter written by a mother whose daughter studied painting with a female academic, (who, based on the description, seems to be Labille-Guiard) she explained that the teacher insisted on maintaining the highest standards of modesty in her studio. Her commitment for female students was evident throughout her membership at the Royal Academy. At a meeting held on September 23, 1790, Labille-Guiard proposed that women be admitted in unlimited numbers and be permitted to serve on the institution's governing board. Both motions were approved.

Labille-Guiard in the face of Revolution 

Instead of fleeing during the French Revolution of 1789, Labille-Guiard stayed in France. However, the royal connections she made throughout her career made her a political suspect. In 1793 she was ordered to destroy some of her royalist works, including the unfinished commission for the Count of Provence. The exile of the Comte of Provence meant Labille-Guiard had not only lost her last royal patron, but she also did not receive a cent of the agreed-upon 30,000 livres. The Revolution further hurt her career when the royal sisters emigrated in February 1791 without paying for several portraits they had commissioned Labille-Guiard to paint. 
The pastel portraits of Marie Adélaïde, Victoire-Louise, and Élisabeth stayed in Labille-Guiard's possession until she died from an illness on April 24, 1803.

Legacy 
Among the public collections holding works by Adélaïde Labille-Guiard are the Getty Museum, the Phoenix Art Museum, Harvard University Art Museums, the Honolulu Museum of Art, Kimbell Art Museum (Fort Worth, Texas), the Los Angeles County Museum of Art, the Louvre, the Metropolitan Museum of Art, the National Gallery of Art (Washington, D.C.), the National Museum in Warsaw, the National Museum of Women in the Arts (Washington, D.C.), the Speed Art Museum (Kentucky) and Versailles.

Labille-Guiard is a featured figure on Judy Chicago's installation piece The Dinner Party, being represented in one of the 999 tiles of the Heritage Floor.

Notes

Bibliography 
 Auricchio, Laura. Adélaïde Labille-Guiard: Artist in the Age of Revolution, Los Angeles: J. Paul Getty Museum, 2009.
 Baetjer, Katharine. "Adélaïde Labille-Guiard (1749–1803)" at Heilbrunn Timeline of Art History, www.metmuseum.org, posted June 2016.
 Chicago, Judy. The Dinner Party: From Creation to Preservation, London: Merrell, 2007. 
 Passez, Anne-Marie. Adélaïde Labille-Guiard: Biographie et catalogue raisonné, Paris: 1973.
 Portalis, Roger (1901). "Adélaïde Labille-Guiard" in Gazette des Beaux-Arts, Lausanne: 1901, p. 352–367.
 Portalis, Roger (1902). Adélaïde Labille-Guiard, Paris: Imprimerie Georges Petit, 1902.
 Cailleux, Jean. "Portrait of Madame Adélaïde of France, Daughter of Louis XV," Burlington Magazine (vol.3, March 1969), supp.i-vi.

External links 

 Labille-Guiard, Adélaïde at Benezit Dictionary of Artists
 Labille-Guiard (née Labille), Adélaïde by Kathleen Nicholson at Grove Art Online
 Royalists to Romantics: Spotlight on Adélaïde Labille-Guiard at National Museum of Women in the Arts
 Biography of Adélaïde Labille-Guiard from the Société Internationale pour l'Étude des Femmes de l'Ancien Régime
 Labille-Guiard, Adélaïde at Neil Jeffares, Dictionary of pastellists before 1800, online edition

1749 births
1803 deaths
French women painters
French portrait painters
18th-century French women artists
18th-century French painters
Painters from Paris
Portrait miniaturists